Wu Mei is the pinyin romanization of:
 Wǔ Méi (五梅; Cantonese: Ng Mui), the legendary kung fu nun.
 Wǔ Mèi (武媚), the given name of the Empress Wu.
 Wùměi (物美), Chinese name of the Wumart retail company.